There are about 350 known moth species of Sudan and South Sudan. The moths (mostly nocturnal) and butterflies (mostly diurnal) together make up the taxonomic order Lepidoptera.

This is a list of moth species which have been recorded in Sudan and South Sudan.

Arctiidae
Acantharctia metaleuca Hampson, 1901
Afrowatsonius fulvomarginalis (Wichgraf, 1921)
Afrowatsonius sudanicus (Rothschild, 1933)
Aloa moloneyi (Druce, 1887)
Alpenus maculosa (Stoll, 1781)
Alpenus nigropunctata (Bethune-Baker, 1908)
Alpenus schraderi (Rothschild, 1910)
Alpenus wichgrafi Watson, 1988
Amata shoa (Hampson, 1898)
Amata tomasina (Butler, 1876)
Amsacta latimarginalis Rothschild, 1933
Caripodia chrysargyria Hampson, 1900
Creatonotos leucanioides Holland, 1893
Creatonotos leucanioides Holland, 1893
Creatonotos punctivitta (Walker, 1854)
Metarctia pumila Hampson, 1909
Oedaleosia concolor Strand, 1912
Paralacydes arborifera (Butler, 1875)
Spilosoma curvilinea Walker, 1855
Spilosoma metaleuca (Hampson, 1905)

Autostichidae
Turatia scioneura (Meyrick, 1929)

Coleophoridae
Coleophora aularia Meyrick, 1924
Coleophora sudanella Rebel, 1916

Cosmopterigidae
Bifascioides leucomelanella (Rebel, 1917)
Gisilia sclerodes (Meyrick, 1909)

Cossidae
Meharia semilactea (Warren & Rothschild, 1905)
Nomima prophanes Durrant, 1916
Paropta henleyi (Warren & Rothschild, 1905)
Phragmatoecioides pectinicornis Strand, 1915

Crambidae
Cataclysta leroii Strand, 1915
Charltona albidalis Hampson, 1919
Cnaphalocrocis trapezalis (Guenée, 1854)
Cornifrons ulceratalis Lederer, 1858
Crambus diarhabdellus Hampson, 1919
Crambus sudanicola Strand, 1915
Culladia achroellum (Mabille, 1900)
Cybalomia pentadalis Lederer, 1855
Cybalomia simplex Warren & Rothschild, 1905
Diplopseustis perieresalis (Walker, 1859)
Elethyia albirufalis (Hampson, 1919)
Euchromius cambridgei (Zeller, 1867)
Euchromius ocellea (Haworth, 1811)
Hellula undalis (Fabricius, 1781)
Herpetogramma phaeopteralis (Guenée, 1854)
Nomophila noctuella ([Denis & Schiffermüller], 1775)
Platytes impar Warren & Rothschild, 1905
Pleuroptya balteata (Fabricius, 1798)
Prionapteryx alternalis Maes, 2002
Prionapteryx soudanensis (Hampson, 1919)
Scirpophaga praelata (Scopoli, 1763)
Spoladea recurvalis (Fabricius, 1775)

Elachistidae
Ethmia quadrinotella (Mann, 1861)

Gelechiidae
Ochrodia subdiminutella (Stainton, 1867)
Pectinophora gossypiella (Saunders, 1844)
Scrobipalpa ergasima (Meyrick, 1916)

Geometridae
Acidaliastis micra Hampson, 1896
Callioratis apicisecta Prout, 1915
Celidomphax prolongata Prout, 1915
Chiasmia ate (Prout, 1926)
Chiasmia maculosa (Warren, 1899)
Chiasmia sudanata (Warren & Rothschild, 1905)
Cleora rostella D. S. Fletcher, 1967
Hemidromodes robusta (Prout, 1913)
Heterostegane minutissima (Swinhoe, 1904)
Idaea granulosa (Warren & Rothschild, 1905)
Idaea microptera (Warren & Rothschild, 1905)
Idaea sanctaria Staudinger, 1900
Isturgia disputaria (Guenée, 1858)
Lomographa indularia (Guenée, 1858)
Microloxia ruficornis Warren, 1897
Omphalucha brunnea (Warren, 1899)
Polystroma steeleae (Prout, 1934)
Prasinocyma immaculata (Thunberg, 1784)
Pseudosterrha paulula (Swinhoe, 1886)
Pseudosterrha rufistrigata (Hampson, 1896)
Scopula adelpharia (Püngeler, 1894)
Scopula natalica (Butler, 1875)
Scopula pseudophema Prout, 1920
Syndromodes invenusta (Wallengren, 1863)
Xanthorhoe exorista Prout, 1922
Zamarada anacantha D. S. Fletcher, 1974
Zamarada delta D. S. Fletcher, 1974
Zamarada melasma D. S. Fletcher, 1974
Zamarada minimaria Swinhoe, 1895
Zamarada nasuta Warren, 1897
Zamarada secutaria (Guenée, 1858)
Zamarada torrida D. S. Fletcher, 1974

Gracillariidae
Acrocercops bifasciata (Walsingham, 1891)
Phyllocnistis citrella Stainton, 1856
Stomphastis conflua (Meyrick, 1914)

Lasiocampidae
Anadiasa obsoleta (Klug, 1830)
Anadiasa simplex Pagenstecher, 1903
Beralade obliquata (Klug, 1830)
Braura nilotica (Aurivillius, 1925)
Chrysopsyche wilsoni Tams, 1938
Odontocheilopteryx maculata Aurivillius, 1905
Streblote butiti (Bethune-Baker, 1906)
Streblote diluta (Aurivillius, 1905)

Limacodidae
Chrysamma purpuripulcra Karsch, 1896
Coenobasis postflavida Hampson, 1910
Gavara caprai Berio, 1937
Macroplectra iracunda Hering, 1928

Lymantriidae
Cropera testacea Walker, 1855
Crorema setinoides (Holland, 1893)
Crorema sudanica Strand, 1915
Euproctis erythrosticta (Hampson, 1910)
Euproctis ostentum Hering, 1926
Euproctis xanthosoma Hampson, 1910

Metarbelidae
Moyencharia winteri Lehmann, 2013

Nepticulidae
Stigmella xystodes (Meyrick, 1916)

Noctuidae
Abrostola confusa Dufay, 1958
Acantholipes circumdata (Walker, 1858)
Achaea catella Guenée, 1852
Achaea lienardi (Boisduval, 1833)
Achaea phaeobasis Hampson, 1913
Acontia basifera Walker, 1857
Acontia buchanani (Rothschild, 1921)
Acontia dichroa (Hampson, 1914)
Acontia discoidoides Hacker, Legrain & Fibiger, 2008
Acontia hortensis Swinhoe, 1884
Acontia insocia (Walker, 1857)
Acontia karachiensis Swinhoe, 1889
Acontia opalinoides Guenée, 1852
Acontia semialba Hampson, 1910
Aegle exsiccata (Warren & Rothschild, 1905)
Aegocera rectilinea Boisduval, 1836
Agrotis biconica Kollar, 1844
Agrotis ipsilon (Hufnagel, 1766)
Agrotis sardzeana Brandt, 1941
Agrotis segetum ([Denis & Schiffermüller], 1775)
Amyna axis Guenée, 1852
Antarchaea conicephala (Staudinger, 1870)
Asplenia melanodonta (Hampson, 1896)
Audea humeralis Hampson, 1902
Audea paulumnodosa Kühne, 2005
Autoba teilhardi (de Joannis, 1909)
Brevipecten niloticus Wiltshire, 1977
Callophisma flavicornis Hampson, 1913
Caradrina clavipalpis (Scopoli, 1763)
Cerocala caelata Karsch, 1896
Cerynea trichobasis Hampson, 1910
Chusaris rhynchinodes Strand, 1915
Clytie infrequens (Swinhoe, 1884)
Clytie sancta (Staudinger, 1900)
Clytie tropicalis Rungs, 1975
Crameria amabilis (Drury, 1773)
Crypsotidia maculifera (Staudinger, 1898)
Crypsotidia mesosema Hampson, 1913
Crypsotidia remanei Wiltshire, 1977
Ctenoplusia limbirena (Guenée, 1852)
Cyligramma latona (Cramer, 1775)
Cyligramma limacina (Guérin-Méneville, 1832)
Diparopsis watersi (Rothschild, 1901)
Dysgonia orbata Berio, 1955
Dysgonia torrida (Guenée, 1852)
Eublemma gayneri (Rothschild, 1901)
Eublemma kruegeri (Wiltshire, 1970)
Eublemma parva (Hübner, [1808])
Eublemma pulverulenta (Warren & Rothschild, 1905)
Eublemma ragusana (Freyer, 1844)
Eublemma robertsi Berio, 1969
Eublemma scitula (Rambur, 1833)
Gesonia nigripalpa Wiltshire, 1977
Gesonia obeditalis Walker, 1859
Gnamptonyx innexa (Walker, 1858)
Grammodes geometrica (Fabricius, 1775)
Grammodes stolida (Fabricius, 1775)
Heliothis nubigera Herrich-Schäffer, 1851
Heliothis viriplaca (Hufnagel, 1766)
Heraclia zenkeri (Karsch, 1895)
Heteropalpia acrosticta (Püngeler, 1904)
Heteropalpia exarata (Mabille, 1890)
Heteropalpia profesta (Christoph, 1887)
Heteropalpia rosacea (Rebel, 1907)
Heteropalpia vetusta (Walker, 1865)
Hiccoda dosaroides Moore, 1882
Hypena abyssinialis Guenée, 1854
Hypena laceratalis Walker, 1859
Hypena lividalis (Hübner, 1790)
Hypena obacerralis Walker, [1859]
Hypena obsitalis (Hübner, [1813])
Hypotacha isthmigera Wiltshire, 1968
Hypotacha ochribasalis (Hampson, 1896)
Iambiodes incerta (Rothschild, 1913)
Iambiodes postpallida Wiltshire, 1977
Leucania melanostrotoides (Strand, 1915)
Loxioda coniventris Strand, 1915
Masalia albiseriata (Druce, 1903)
Masalia bimaculata (Moore, 1888)
Masalia cheesmanae Seymour, 1972
Masalia decorata (Moore, 1881)
Masalia fissifascia (Hampson, 1903)
Masalia flaviceps (Hampson, 1903)
Masalia galatheae (Wallengren, 1856)
Masalia terracottoides (Rothschild, 1921)
Matopo selecta (Walker, 1865)
Metachrostis quinaria (Moore, 1881)
Metopoceras kneuckeri (Rebel, 1903)
Mocis mayeri (Boisduval, 1833)
Mocis proverai Zilli, 2000
Myana sopora Swinhoe, 1884
Ophiusa mejanesi (Guenée, 1852)
Oraesia intrusa (Krüger, 1939)
Ozarba badia (Swinhoe, 1886)
Ozarba exoplaga Berio, 1940
Ozarba phaea (Hampson, 1902)
Ozarba rufula Hampson, 1910
Pandesma quenavadi Guenée, 1852
Pandesma robusta (Walker, 1858)
Pericyma mendax (Walker, 1858)
Plecopterodes moderata (Wallengren, 1860)
Polydesma umbricola Boisduval, 1833
Polytela cliens (Felder & Rogenhofer, 1874)
Prionofrontia ochrosia Hampson, 1926
Pseudozarba bipartita (Herrich-Schäffer, 1950)
Raparna bipuncta Warren & Rothschild, 1905
Raparna minima Warren & Rothschild, 1905
Rhynchina albiscripta Hampson, 1916
Schausia mkabi Kiriakoff, 1974
Sesamia cretica Lederer, 1857
Sesamia epunctifera Hampson, 1902
Sesamia geyri (Strand, 1915)
Sesamia nonagrioides (Lefèbvre, 1827)
Speia vuteria (Stoll, 1790)
Sphingomorpha chlorea (Cramer, 1777)
Spodoptera cilium Guenée, 1852
Spodoptera exempta (Walker, 1857)
Spodoptera exigua (Hübner, 1808)
Spodoptera littoralis (Boisduval, 1833)
Syngrapha circumflexa (Linnaeus, 1767)
Tathorhynchus exsiccata (Lederer, 1855)
Tathorhynchus leucobasis Bethune-Baker, 1911
Timora showaki Pinhey, 1956
Trichoplusia ni (Hübner, [1803])
Trigonodes hyppasia (Cramer, 1779)
Tytroca fasciolata (Warren & Rothschild, 1905)
Ulotrichopus stertzi (Püngeler, 1907)
Ulotrichopus tinctipennis (Hampson, 1902)
Vittaplusia vittata (Wallengren, 1856)

Nolidae
Arcyophora patricula (Hampson, 1902)
Earias insulana (Boisduval, 1833)
Earias nubica (Strand, 1915)
Neaxestis mesogonia (Hampson, 1905)
Selepa docilis Butler, 1881

Notodontidae
Antheua gallans (Karsch, 1895)
Antheua woerdeni (Snellen, 1872)
Desmeocraera leucophaea Gaede, 1928
Epidonta brunnea (Rothschild, 1917)
Leptolepida henleyi (Warren & Rothschild, 1905)
Notoxantha aurorina Kiriakoff, 1961
Zerafia drymonides Strand, 1915

Plutellidae
Plutella xylostella (Linnaeus, 1758)

Psychidae
Acanthopsyche ebneri (Rebel, 1917)
Auchmophila kordofensis Rebel, 1907

Pterophoridae
Agdistis arabica Amsel, 1958
Agdistis tamaricis (Zeller, 1847)

Pyralidae
Actenia wollastoni (Rothschild, 1901)
Aglossa aglossalis (Ragonot, 1892)
Ancylosis costistrigella (Ragonot, 1890)
Ancylosis faustinella (Zeller, 1867)
Ancylosis lacteicostella (Ragonot, 1887)
Ancylosis limoniella (Chrétien, 1911)
Ancylosis nubeculella (Ragonot, 1887)
Anerastia lotella (Hübner, 1813)
Arenipses sabella Hampson, 1901
Cadra calidella (Guenée, 1845)
Cadra figulilella (Gregson, 1871)
Corcyra cephalonica (Stainton, 1866)
Ectomyelois ceratoniae (Zeller, 1839)
Endotricha consobrinalis Zeller, 1852
Epicrocis ferrealis (Hampson, 1898)
Epischnia cinerosalis Walker & Rothschild, 1905
Epischnia masticella Ragonot, 1893
Euzophera trigeminata Warren & Rothschild, 1905
Exodesis vaterfieldi Hampson, 1919
Gymnancyla canella ([Denis & Schiffermüller], 1775)
Lorymana noctuiformis Strand, 1915
Nephopterix metamelana Hampson, 1896
Polyocha anerastiodes Warren & Rothschild, 1905
Psorosana testaceipennis Strand, 1915
Pyralis obsoletalis Mann, 1864
Raphimetopus ablutella (Zeller, 1839)
Staudingeria suboblitella (Ragonot, 1888)
Staudingeria yerburii (Butler, 1884)
Zophodia straminea Strand, 1915

Saturniidae
Bunaea alcinoe (Stoll, 1780)
Bunaeopsis hersilia (Westwood, 1849)
Epiphora albidus (Druce, 1886)
Epiphora bauhiniae (Guérin-Méneville, 1832)
Epiphora getula (Maassen & Weymer, 1885)
Epiphora magdalena Grünberg, 1909
Epiphora ploetzi (Weymer, 1880)
Epiphora vacuna (Westwood, 1849)
Holocerina angulata (Aurivillius, 1893)
Holocerina istsariensis Stoneham, 1962

Sesiidae
Melittia ruficincta (Felder, 1874)

Sphingidae
Ceridia heuglini (C. & R. Felder, 1874)
Hippotion celerio (Linnaeus, 1758)
Hippotion rebeli Rothschild & Jordan, 1903
Hyles livornica (Esper, 1780)
Leucophlebia afra Karsch, 1891
Neopolyptychus consimilis (Rothschild & Jordan, 1903)
Nephele peneus (Cramer, 1776)
Polyptychoides grayii (Walker, 1856)
Polyptychoides niloticus (Jordan, 1921)
Pseudoclanis abyssinicus (Lucas, 1857)
Pseudoclanis molitor (Rothschild & Jordan, 1912)

Thyrididae
Netrocera setioides Felder, 1874

Tineidae
Ceratophaga tragoptila (Meyrick, 1917)
Ceratophaga vastella (Zeller, 1852)
Edosa pyrochra (Gozmány, 1965)
Hapsifera rhodoptila Meyrick, 1920
Machaeropteris baloghi Gozmány, 1965
Perissomastix nigriceps Warren & Rothschild, 1905
Perissomastix perdita Gozmány, 1965
Perissomastix taeniaecornis (Walsingham, 1896)
Philagraulella punica (Meyrick, 1930)
Sphallestasis cristata (Gozmány, 1967)
Syncalipsis sudanica Gozmány, 1965
Tinea murariella Staudinger, 1859
Trichophaga abruptella (Wollaston, 1858)

Tortricidae
Bactra bactrana (Kennel, 1901)
Bactra legitima Meyrick, 1911
Bactra tornastis Meyrick, 1909
Bactra venosana (Zeller, 1847)
Eucosma ioplintha Meyrick, 1930
Fulcrifera refrigescens (Meyrick, 1924)
Selania detrita (Meyrick, 1928)

Xyloryctidae
Scythris amplexella Bengtsson, 2002
Scythris camelella Walsingham, 1907
Scythris fissurella Bengtsson, 1997
Scythris nipholecta Meyrick, 1924
Scythris pangalactis Meyrick, 1933

Zygaenidae
Epiorna abessynica (Koch, 1865)

References

External links 
 

Moths
Moths
Sudan
Sudan